Ana Botella Gómez (born 12 February 1958) is a Spanish politician of the Socialist Party serving as Member of the Congress of Deputies representing Valencia. From 2018 to 2020, she served as the 11th Secretary of State for Security of the Government of Spain.

Biography
Botella was born in the Valencia in 1958. She has a degree in Geography and History by the University of Valencia, being one of the best of the promotion and awarded with the Extraordinary Degree Award. She also has a Diploma in Foreign Trade from the UNED (1984), a Master in Public Management from the Polytechnic University of Valencia (1995 - 1997), and a Diploma as University Specialist in International Security and Conflicts, from the Gutiérrez Mellado-UNED University Institute (2014).

As a civil servant, she has develop her career in the Regional Administration of Valencia. There, she served as Director-General of the Valencian Tourist Institute within the Regional Ministry of Industry, Trade and Tourism and as Chief of the Area of Promotion of Innovation and Competitiveness of the current Valencian Institute for Business Competitiveness.

Between 2007 and 2010 she served as Councillor of the City Council of Valencia with the Spanish Socialist Workers' Party. In 2010, prime minister José Luis Rodríguez Zapatero appointed her as Central Government' Delegate in the Valencian Community replacing Ricardo Peralta Ortega until 2012.

She made the leap to national politics in 2016, when she was elected MP by the Province of Valencia in the 2015 general election. She was re-elected in the 2016 and 2019 general elections. In June 2018, Interior Minister Fernando Grande-Marlaska appointed her as Secretary of State for Security, the second highest position within the Interior Ministry. She left the office on January 18, 2020, and she was replaced by the Minister's chief of staff, Rafael Pérez Ruiz.

Awards
  Cross of Merit of the Civil Guard (2014)

References

1958 births
Living people
Members of the 11th Congress of Deputies (Spain)
Members of the 12th Congress of Deputies (Spain)
Members of the 13th Congress of Deputies (Spain)
Members of the 14th Congress of Deputies (Spain)
Secretaries of State of Spain
Politicians from the Valencian Community
Women members of the Congress of Deputies (Spain)